Ilija Belošević (born 13 April 1972) is a Serbian basketball referee.

Refereeing career
Belošević has been a referee since 1987 and an international referee since 1997. At the end of the 2020–21 EuroLeague season, he was the EuroLeague's all-time leader in games refereed (387).

Personal life
Belošević's father Obrad was a referee who was inducted into the FIBA Hall of Fame.

References

1972 births
Living people
Sportspeople from Belgrade
Serbian basketball referees
EuroLeague referees
FIBA referees